Right After Torrance (RAT) Beach is the unofficial name of a short stretch of Los Angeles County unincorporated beach, officially known as Torrance County Beach, located along southern Santa Monica Bay, contiguous to the city of Torrance, California and neighboring Palos Verdes Estates in Los Angeles County.

Access
RAT beach is located in a cove in between Torrance Beach and Malaga Cove. It is usually not very crowded, due to the limited access to the beach. There are no roads to it, needing a walk either from Torrance Beach or the Palos Verdes Beach and Athletic Club. Due to its location in a cove and the presence of a large kelp forest just offshore, the beach collects a lot of kelp on the shores and in the water.

Beach Activities 

The beach is a popular local surf, windsurfing, diving and spear fishing spot.  The world famous giant kelp forest just off the coast offer great diving as well as spear fishing.  The uncrowded beach attracts windsurfers and surfers, although the beach's waves are not normally very big.

See also
Madrona Marsh
Columbia Park, Torrance, California
List of beaches in California

References

Beaches of Southern California
Parks in Los Angeles County, California
Geography of Torrance, California
Beaches of Los Angeles County, California